Dustin Kerns is an American college basketball coach, and current head coach of the Appalachian State Mountaineers men's basketball team.

Coaching career
Kerns served as a student assistant at Clemson for its men's basketball team, and after graduation landed his first coaching job at Tennessee Tech. Following a one-year stop as a graduate assistant at Tennessee, Kerns joined Mike Young's staff at Wofford from 2004 to 2007, then moved on to Santa Clara as an assistant from 2007 to 2013. He returned to Wofford as the Associate Head Coach in 2013, where he was on staff for the Terriers' 2014 and 2015 NCAA Tournament appearances.

On May 23, 2017, Kerns was named the head coach at Presbyterian.  Kerns took over a Presbyterian program that had endured 12 straight losing seasons and a 5 win campaign the previous season.  The program quickly turned around as in his 2nd season at Presbyterian, he led the Blue Hose to a 20 win season, first ever post-season berth, and quarterfinal appearance in the CIT Tournament.  Kerns was named a Finalist for the Jim Phelan National Coach of the Year and the Hugh Durham Mid-Major National Coach of the Year. After two seasons and a 31–37 record, including a nine–win turnaround in season two with the Blue Hose, Kerns was named the head coach at Appalachian State on March 28, 2019.

Head coaching record

NCAA DI

References

Living people
American men's basketball coaches
Appalachian State Mountaineers men's basketball coaches
Basketball coaches from Tennessee
Clemson University alumni
People from Kingsport, Tennessee
Presbyterian Blue Hose men's basketball coaches
Santa Clara Broncos men's basketball coaches
Tennessee Tech Golden Eagles men's basketball coaches
Tennessee Volunteers basketball coaches
Year of birth missing (living people)